The Pittsburgh Conference on Analytical Chemistry and Applied Spectroscopy, referred to internationally as Pittcon, is a non-profit educational organization based in Pennsylvania that organizes an annual Conference and Exposition on laboratory science. It is sponsored by the Spectroscopy Society of Pittsburgh and the Society for Analytical Chemists of Pittsburgh. The Conference has traditionally been the most attended annual conference on analytical chemistry and applied spectroscopy in the world. Pittcon presents several awards each year to individuals who have made outstanding contributions to the various fields in analytical chemistry.

References

Scientific organizations based in the United States
Annual events in Pennsylvania
Education in Pennsylvania